Angeli may refer to:

Surname

In arts and media
Alfredo Angeli (born 1927), Italian director and screenwriter
Angeli (cartoonist), Brazilian comic book writer and illustrator
Ève Angeli (born 1980), French pop singer
Filippo d'Angeli (1600–1660), Italian painter of the Baroque period
Franco Angeli (1935-1988), Italian sculptor and painter
Giulio Cesare Angeli (1570–1630), Italian painter of the early Baroque
Giuseppe Angeli (1709–1798), Italian painter of the late-Baroque
Heinrich von Angeli (1840–1925), Austrian painter
Lou Angeli (1951–2013), American writer and film maker
Marguerite de Angeli (1889–1987), American writer and illustrator of children's books
Michael Angeli (born 1970), American writer and television producer
Pier Angeli (1932–1971), Italian-born television and film actress

In politics
Alfredo de Angeli (born 1956), rural leader of the Federación Agraria Argentina of Entre Ríos
Giuseppe Angeli (1931-2016), Italian politician
Jake Angeli (born 1988), American conspiracy theorist and activist

In sport
Amedeo Angeli (born 1911), Italian bobsledder
Arnor Angeli (born 1991), Belgian footballer
Benedicto Antonio Angeli (born 1939), Brazilian football player
Jordan Angeli (born 1986), American soccer player from Lakewood, Colorado
Virna De Angeli (Gravedona, 27 February 1976), Italian former sprinter

Others with the surname
Alicia Gironella D'Angeli, Mexican chef
Angelo Angeli (1864–1931), Italian chemist
Edgar Angeli (1892–1945), Croatian rear admiral of Navy of Croatia
Francesco degli Angeli (1567–1628), Italian Jesuit missionary to Ethiopia
Jerome de Angelis (1567–1623), Italian Jesuit missionary to Japan
Stefano degli Angeli (1623–1697), Italian mathematician

Given name
Angeli Bayani, Filipino actress
Angeli Gonzales (born 1994), Filipino teen actress
Angeli Nicole Sanoy (born 2001), Filipina child actress
Marco Angeli di Sartèna (1905–1985), politician from Corsica
Maria Angeli Tabaquero (born 1989), Filipino volleyball athlete
Angeli Vanlaanen (born 1985), American freestyle skier

Other uses
Angeli, Finland, a village in Finnish Lapland
Angeli di Varano, a village near Ancona in central Italy
Angelica vestis, a  monastic garment
Angels, in the Italian language
The Angeli–Rimini reaction
Angeli, a novel by Alessandro Defilippi

See also
Angelic (disambiguation)
Angelis (disambiguation)
Angelo (disambiguation)

Italian-language surnames